Hatsukaichi-shiyakusyo-mae (Hera) is a Hiroden station on Hiroden Miyajima Line, located in front of Hatsukaichi City Hall, in Shingu, Hatsukaichi, Hiroshima.

Routes
From Hatsukaichi-shiyakusyo-mae (Hera) Station, there is one of Hiroden Streetcar routes.
 Hiroshima Station - Hiroden-miyajima-guchi Route

Connections
█ Miyajima Line

Hiroden-hatsukaichi — Hatsukaichi-shiyakusyo-mae (Hera) — Miyauchi

Around station
Hatsukaichi City Hall
Hatsukaichi City Sports Center
Hatsukaichi Post Office
Hatsukaichi Cultural Hall "SAKURAPIA"

History
Opened as "Hera" on November 1, 1984.
Moved on January 28, 2006.
Rebuilt and renamed to "Hatsukaichi-shiyakusyo-mae (Hera)" on June 1, 2006.
Started Sakura-Bus services on June 2, 2006.

See also

Hiroden Streetcar Lines and Routes

References

Hatsukaichi-shiyakusyo-mae (Hera) Station
Railway stations in Japan opened in 1984